Bradley Lewis Vierling (born May 18, 1986) is a former American football center. He played college football at Vanderbilt.

Early years
Vierling attended Central Bucks East High School as a three-year starter at offensive tackle and also started at defensive tackle and defensive end his during his junior and senior seasons. He was named second-team all-state as a senior and earned letters in basketball and track and field.

College
At Vanderbilt, Vierling was a three time letterman and two-year starter, ending career with 25 consecutive starts. He also served as team captain in final two seasons and was member of 2008-09 SEC Academic Honor Roll. He started all 12 games as a senior and received team’s postseason Offensive Lineman of the Year award.

Professional career

Pittsburgh Steelers
Vierling was originally signed as an undrafted rookie by the Pittsburgh Steelers on April 27, 2010, however the team placed him on waivers on June 15.

Jacksonville Jaguars
On August 31, 2010, he was signed by the Jacksonville Jaguars as a free agent. He was waived on September 3, however he was later assigned to the club's practice squad on September 6, 2010. On February 7, 2011, he was signed to a contract for the 2011 season. Vierling was released from the practice squad on December 30, 2011.

Pittsburgh Steelers (second stint)
On April 23, 2012, he was re-signed by the Pittsburgh Steelers.

References
Bio from the Jacksonville Jaguars
Profile from Vanderbilt
Jags add four players to practice squad
Jaguars make two roster moves

1986 births
Living people
Players of American football from Pennsylvania
American football centers
Vanderbilt Commodores football players
Pittsburgh Steelers players
Jacksonville Jaguars players